The 1868 United States presidential election in California was held on November 5, 1872, as part of the 1872 United States presidential election. State voters chose six representatives, or electors, to the Electoral College, who voted for president and vice president.

California voted for the Republican incumbent, Ulysses S. Grant, over the Liberal Republican nominee, New York Tribune publisher Horace Greeley.

Results

References

California
1872
1872 California elections